Raymond George Hardenbergh Seitz (born December 8, 1940) is a former career diplomat and U.S. Ambassador to the United Kingdom. He was born in Honolulu, Hawaii on December 8, 1940. He is the son of United States Army Major General John F. R. Seitz (d. 1978) and Helen (Hardenbergh) Seitz (d. 1953).

He graduated from Yale University in 1963 with a BA in history, following which he spent two years teaching in Dallas, Texas. He joined the US Foreign Service in 1966. He was the first career diplomat in modern history to be made Ambassador to the UK – the post is usually given to a political appointee.

Career
 His first posting was in Montreal, Quebec, Canada as Consular Officer.
 In 1968 he was assigned to Nairobi, Kenya as Political Officer, serving concurrently as Vice-Consul in the Seychelle Islands.
 After two years as Principal Officer in Bukavu, Zaire, he returned to the State Department in 1972 to be appointed Director of the Secretariat Staff under Secretary of State Henry Kissinger.
 He subsequently served as Special Assistant to the Director General of the Foreign Service.
 In 1975 he was assigned for the first time to the US Embassy in London as First Secretary.
 In 1978 he received the Director General's Award for Reporting.
 He returned to Washington 1979 as Deputy Executive Secretary to the Department of State, serving in the offices of Secretaries of State Vance, Muskie and Haig.
 In October 1981, he became Deputy Assistant Secretary for Public Affairs.
 In July 1982, Secretary of State George Shultz appointed him Executive Assistant to the Secretary of State.
 Three years later, he returned to the London Embassy as Minister.
 In 1986 and 1988 he received the Presidential Award for Meritorious Service.
 President Bush nominated him as Assistant Secretary of State for Europe and Canada in June 1989.
 He served in this capacity until his nomination by the President as ambassador.
 On completion of his term as Assistant Secretary of State, the Federal Republic of Germany conferred on Ambassador Seitz the Knight Commander's Cross.
 He was sworn in as ambassador to the Court of St. James's, by Secretary of State James Baker on April 25, 1991, and presented his credentials to Queen Elizabeth II on June 25, 1991.
 On May 10, 1994, he simultaneously resigned from his post as ambassador, and from the US Foreign Service, following a career of 28 years.

Seitz was a member of the Founding Council of the Rothermere American Institute at Oxford University.

Retirement
Since retiring from the foreign service, Seitz has held numerous directorships, governorships, and trusteeships. He was Senior Managing Director at Lehman Brothers International from 1995–1996, and Vice-Chairman from 1996–2003. He has held non-executive directorships on the boards of British Airways, Hong Kong Telecom, Marconi, General Electric Co, Rio Tinto Group and Cable & Wireless. As of November 2004, he is currently on the boards of the Chubb Group, PCCW, and Hollinger International.

He was a trustee of the National Gallery between 1996 and 2001 and was a member of the Founding Council of the Rothermere American Institute, University of Oxford.
He is a current governor of the Ditchley Foundation.

He is a former trustee of the Royal Academy of Arts and the World Monuments Fund. He is a former member of the Advisory Council of the Institute for International Studies at Stanford University.

He is married with three children.

Honorary degrees
Seitz has received a number of honorary degrees, among them:

 Honorary Doctor of Public Administration, The American International University in London (Richmond), 1992
 Honorary Doctor of Laws, Reading University (UK), 1992
 Honorary Doctor of Laws, University of Bath (UK), 1993
 Honorary Doctor of Civil Law, University of Durham (UK), 1994
 Honorary Doctorate from Heriot-Watt University in November 1994 
 Honorary Doctor of Laws, Leicester University (UK), 23 July 1999
 Honorary Doctor of Civil Law, University of Newcastle upon Tyne (UK), 13 October 1999

He has also received honorary degrees from the universities of Buckingham, Royal Holloway, Leeds, and the Open University.

Awards

 1999: Awarded the Churchill Medal of Honour by the English-Speaking Union.
 1999: Became the first American citizen ever to be awarded the Freedom of the City of London.
 2001: Elected as an Honorary Freeman of the Merchant Taylors' Company.

Publications
Seitz has written several articles for the Daily Telegraph, Sunday Telegraph, The Times and The Literary Review, as well as broadcasting several essays for the BBC.  He published his first book, Over Here in 1998, an autobiographical review of his time as ambassador and life in the UK.

Notes

1940 births
Living people
People from Honolulu
Ambassadors of the United States to the United Kingdom
United States Foreign Service personnel
20th-century American diplomats